Mauvaises nouvelles des étoiles is the fourteenth studio album by French singer-songwriter Serge Gainsbourg. It was released through Mercury Records and Universal Music Group on 17 November 1981. Produced by Philippe Lerichomme, the album musically follows the reggae style of its predecessor, Aux Armes et Caetera (1979).

Critical reception 

John Bush of AllMusic gave the album a mixed review, stating: "The breezy melodies of his prime material from the '60s and '70s are unfortunately missing." He also further added: "Though the sound and production is up to Gainsbourg's usual high standards, the songs are much weaker than expected. With little to anchor it except the players and Gainsbourg's seedy vocal delivery, Mauvaises Nouvelles des Etoiles simply floats away."

Track listing

Personnel 
Credits adapted from liner notes.

 Serge Gainsbourg – vocals, arrangements
 The I Threes (Marcia Griffiths, Rita Marley, Judy Mowatt) – backing vocals
 Robbie Shakespeare – bass guitar
 Sly Dunbar – drums
 Mikey "Mao" Chung – lead guitar
 Radcliffe "Dougie" Bryan – rhythm guitar
 Ansel Collins – organ, acoustic piano
 Uziah "Sticky" Thompson – percussion
Technical
Steven Stanley - recording, mixing
Lord Snowdon - photography

Charts

Certifications and sales

References

External links 
 

1981 albums
Serge Gainsbourg albums
Reggae albums by French artists